Glendale is an unincorporated community in Clark County, Nevada, United States.

Glendale was settled in 1855. The community was named for the valley in which it is situated. It was formally established as an unincorporated town in 1979. At that time, it consisted entirely of land owned by Charlie Hester, who operated a motel, gas station, and restaurant.  The town's population peaked at 36, mainly comprising Hester's family and employees.

In 1996, county commissioners approved a plan to redevelop Glendale as a casino resort with 600 hotel rooms, despite objections from residents of nearby Moapa Valley; the project was never realized.

The town was dissolved in 2001, because its population had declined to four, making it impossible to fill the five seats on the town board. Glendale later became part of the unincorporated town of Moapa Valley. In 2009, the town boundaries were shifted, making Glendale part of Moapa.

Notes 

Unincorporated communities in Clark County, Nevada